Ziehl–Neelsen staining is a type of acid-fast stain, first introduced by Paul Ehrlich. Ziehl–Neelsen staining is a bacteriological stain used to identify acid-fast organisms, mainly Mycobacteria. It is named for two German doctors who modified the stain: the bacteriologist Franz Ziehl (1859–1926) and the pathologist Friedrich Neelsen (1854–1898).

Mycobacteria
In anatomic pathology specimens, immunohistochemistry and modifications of Ziehl–Neelsen staining (such as the Fite-Faraco method) have comparable diagnostic utility. Both of them are superior to traditional Ziehl–Neelsen staining.

The genus Mycobacterium is a slow growing bacteria, made up of small rods that are slightly curved or straight, and are considered to be gram positive. Some mycobacteria are free-living saprophytes, but many are pathogens that cause disease in animals and humans. Mycobacterium bovis causes tuberculosis in cattle. Since tuberculosis can be spread to humans, milk is pasteurized to kill any of the bacteria. The Mycobacteria species that causes tuberculosis (TB) in humans is Mycobacterium tuberculosis, which is an airborne bacterium that typically infects the human lungs. Testing for TB includes blood testing, skin tests, and chest X-rays. When looking at the smears for TB, it is stained using an acid-fast stain. These acid-fast organisms like Mycobacterium contain large amounts of lipid substances within their cell walls called mycolic acids. These acids resist staining by ordinary methods such as a Gram stain. It can also be used to stain a few other bacteria, such as Nocardia. The reagents used for Ziehl–Neelsen staining are carbol fuchsin, acid alcohol, and methylene blue. Acid-fast bacilli are bright red after staining.

Fungi
Ziehl–Neelsen staining is a type of narrow spectrum fungal stain. Narrow spectrum fungal stains are selective, and they can help differentiate and identify fungi. The results of Ziehl–Neelsen staining is variable because many fungal cell walls are not acid fast. An example of a common type of acid-fast fungus that is usually stained with Ziehl–Neelsen staining is called Histoplasma (HP). Histoplasma is found in soil and the feces of birds and bats. Humans can contract histoplasmosis by inhalation of the fungal spores. Histoplasma enters the body and goes to the lungs where the spores turn into yeast. The yeast gets into the blood stream and affects lymph nodes and other parts of the body. Usually people do not get sick from inhaling the spores, but if they do they usually have flu like symptoms. Another variation on this staining method is used in mycology to differentially stain acid-fast incrustations in the cuticular hyphae of certain species of fungi in the genus Russula. Some free endospores can be confused with small yeasts, so staining is used to identify the unknown fungi. It is also useful in the identification of some protozoa, namely Cryptosporidium and Isospora. The Ziehl–Neelsen stain can also hinder diagnosis in the case of paragonimiasis because the eggs in sputum sample for ovum and parasite (O&P) can be dissolved by the stain, and is often used in this clinical setting because signs and symptoms of paragonimiasis closely resemble those of TB.

History
In 1882 Robert Koch discovered the etiology of tuberculosis. Soon after Koch's discovery, Paul Ehrlich developed a stain for mycobacterium tuberculosis, called the alum hematoxylin stain. Franz Ziehl then altered Ehrlich's staining technique by using carbolic acid as the mordant. Friedrich Neelsen kept Ziehl's choice of mordant but changed the primary stain to carbol fuchsin. Ziehl and Neelsen's modifications together have developed the Ziehl–Neelsen stain. Another acid-fast stain was developed by Joseph Kinyoun by using the Ziehl–Neelsen staining technique but removing the heating step from the procedure. This new stain from Kinyoun was named the Kinyoun stain.

Procedure
A typical AFB stain procedure involves dropping the cells in suspension onto a slide, then air drying the liquid and heat fixing the cells.

Studies have shown that an AFB stain without a culture has a poor negative predictive value. An AFB culture should be performed along with an AFB stain; this has a much higher negative predictive value.

Mechanism explanation 
The mechanism of action of the Ziehl-Neelsen stain is not completely understood, but it is thought to involve a chemical reaction between the acidic dyes and the cell walls of the bacteria. The acidity of the dyes causes them to bind more strongly to the cell walls of the bacteria than to other cells or tissues. This results in the selective staining of only those cells that have a high density of cell wall material, such as acid-fast bacteria.

The Ziehl-Neelsen stain is a two step staining process. In the first step, the tissue is stained with a basic fuchsin solution, which stains all cells pink. In the second step, the tissue is incubated in an acid alcohol solution, which decolorizes all cells except for acid-fast cells, which retain the color and appeared as red. The mechanisms by which this color is produced are not well understood, but it is thought that the interaction of the basic fuchsin with the cell wall components of bacteria creates a new molecule that is responsible for the color.

Modifications
 1% sulfuric acid alcohol for actinomycetes, nocardia.
 0.5–1% sulfuric acid alcohol for oocysts of isospora, cyclospora.
 0.25–0.5% sulfuric acid alcohol for bacterial endospores.
 Differential staining – glacial acetic acid used, no heat applied, secondary stain is Loeffler's methylene blue.
 Kinyoun modification (or cold Ziehl–Neelsen technique) is also available.
 A protocol in which a detergent is substituted for the highly toxic phenol in the fuchsin staining solution.

See also
 Lowenstein–Jensen medium
 Gram stain
 Kinyoun stain
 Acid-fastness
 Franz Ziehl
 Friedrich Neelsen

References

Bibliography
 "Microbiology with Diseases by Body System", Robert W. Bauman, 2009, Pearson Education, Inc.

External links
 
 Ziehl–Neelsen protocol (PDF format).

Microscopy
Microbiology techniques
Laboratory techniques
Histopathology
Histotechnology
Staining dyes
Staining
Bacteriology
Acid-fast bacilli